David Hallou (born September 5, 1966 in Montcy-Notre-Dame, France) is a former professional footballer who played as a defender.

External links
David Hallou profile at chamoisfc79.fr

1966 births
Living people
French footballers
Association football defenders
CS Sedan Ardennes players
Chamois Niortais F.C. players
Ligue 2 players